Pârâul Radului may refer to:

 Pârâul Radului, a tributary of the Capra in Neamț County, Romania
 Pârâul Radului, a tributary of the Oanțu in Neamț County, Romania